I, the Jury is a 1953 American film noir crime film based on the 1947 novel I, the Jury by Mickey Spillane. It was directed by Harry Essex, produced by Victor Saville's company, Parklane Pictures and released through United Artists.

The film is notable for being the first one based on a Mike Hammer novel. Biff Elliot stars as Hammer. It was filmed in 3-D and was available with stereophonic sound.

The story begins with Mike Hammer on the vengeance trail when Jack, a friend, is murdered. Hammer sets out to find the killer, working his way through an increasingly large pile of suspects (and corpses).

Plot

Shortly before Christmas in New York City, one-armed insurance investigator Jack Williams (Robert Swanger) is looking at a college yearbook photo of John Hansen when someone slips into his apartment and shoots him to death. Hot-headed private investigator Mike Hammer (Biff Elliot), Jack's war buddy, vows to avenge his friend's death despite a warning from Pat Chambers (Preston Foster), captain of the homicide squad, to let the police handle the case. Pat is unable to calm Mike, who roughs up a wisecracking reporter before leaving the crime scene. Knowing that Mike will forge ahead with an investigation regardless of his advice, Pat urges the offended reporter to publish an article disclosing that Mike is on the job.

Mike goes to see Jack's fiancée, Myrna Devlin, a torch singer and reformed drug addict, but she is too distraught to talk with him. The next day, Mike's secretary Velda tells him about the article, titled "I, the Jury", which suggests that Mike knows the identity of the killer, thereby making him a target. Because Pat has given him a guest list from Jack's recent party, Mike surmises that the police captain is using him to draw out the killer.

Mike begins his investigation, first visiting wealthy fight promoter and art collector George Kalecki (Alan Reed) in upstate New York. Kalecki introduces his live-in friend, John Hansen, as college student Hal Kines (Bob Cunningham), and claims they were home together after the party. As Mike is leaving, he looks through a window and sees the men arguing. Mike next visits alluring psychoanalyst and author Charlotte Manning (Peggie Castle), who was treating both Jack and Myrna. Charlotte flirts with Mike but provides no new information.

Afterward, Mike finds Pat waiting for him. He is told that Kines moved out of Kalecki's house and that Kines believes Mike attempted to shoot him. Kines's new address is the same building where two other party guests, twin sisters Esther and Mary Bellamy, reside. Mike searches Kines's apartment and finds photos of him and Kalecki in Europe before and after World War II.

When Kines returns unexpectedly and grabs Mike's arm, the detective beats him up. He goes upstairs to see Mary, who knew Jack when he worked as a guard at her father's estate. As Mike resists Mary's attempts to seduce him, he questions her about the party and learns that Charlotte drove her, Myrna and Esther home that night after Jack and Myrna had an argument.

Later at his office, ex-boxer Killer Thompson reveals to Mike and Velda (Margaret Sheridan) that Kalecki, his former manager, runs a numbers racket. Mike seeks more information about the racket but his questions earn him only a severe beating by some thugs. Charlotte tends to his wounds and restores his spirits with a kiss, then asks if Jack might have left a message for Mike before he died.

Mike slips into Jack's apartment through a window to avoid the policeman on guard, and finds a note from Pat, who anticipated his arrival. Mike also finds Jack's diary, which includes notations about a woman named Eileen Vickers (Mary Anderson), who changed her name to Mary Wright, as well as a note that Jack had been planning to raid a dance school with the police in a few days. Mike locates Eileen's father, veterinarian R.H. Vickers, who reveals that he had asked Jack to help his daughter after she ran away from college with John Hansen. Mike finds Eileen at a dance school that is a front for prostitution. Although she is shocked to hear about Jack's death, she only knows that he wanted her to get help from Charlotte.

Despite all the information he has gathered, Mike has more questions than answers. He and Pat continue their research by looking through college yearbooks and find the photo of Hal Kines, who is identified as John Hansen. After police implement Jack's raid on the dance studio, they find Eileen's and Kines's dead bodies in Eileen's room. After Kalecki admits that he and Kines had argued over the young man's involvement with Esther, Mike is baffled as to why he was found with Eileen. Confusion continues to mount, and Charlotte and Mike are nearly killed when someone fires at them outside his office. Mike is awakened that night by Bobo (an uncredited Elisha Cook Jr.), a slow-witted former boxer now working as a department store Santa Claus, who warns Mike that "the big man" is after him. After learning that Kines has been posing as a college student for twenty years, Velda suspects that he may have been running Kalecki's numbers racket at school, using his identity as a student as a cover. Mike goes to search Kines's room at the fraternity house and discovers Kalecki inside burning Kines's papers. Kalecki shoots at Mike and is killed when Mike fires back. Mike grabs Kalecki's gun just as the police arrive to arrest him.

Angered that Mike is taking the law into his own hands, Pat waits until the next day to release him from jail. Mike then gives him Kalecki's gun and they later search Kalecki's safe-deposit box, which is filled with stolen vintage European jewelry. The detectives now realize that Jack must have been investigating Kalecki and Kines, who had been fencing stolen jewelry from Europe for years. A police analyst determines that although all four murders were committed by the same weapon, it was not Kalecki's gun. Knowing that Myrna was once a jewel thief, Pat now suspects that she may have been influenced by Kalecki to murder her fiancé.

As before, Mike confides in Charlotte, with whom he has fallen in love, and tells her he believes that Kines worked the college campuses to recruit new thieves for Kalecki. When Pat learns that Myrna is drunk in a bar, he sends Mike and Charlotte to retrieve her, and they take the drunken woman to Charlotte's apartment to sober up. After Mike leaves, however, Charlotte injects Myrna with sodium pentothal and questions her about Jack, but Myrna is too disoriented to respond. Meanwhile, Mike is beaten up by Kalecki's thugs at his office, but he turns the tables on them and they are eventually arrested; however, they reveal no new information when questioned. When Myrna is found dead in the street from a hit and run accident, the medical examiner finds the needle mark on her arm, prompting Pat to assume that she had returned to drug use. Mike then realizes that Charlotte murdered Myrna, and surmises that Charlotte found out about the jewelry racket during a hypnosis section with Kines and that she plans to take over Kalecki's business. Mike waits for Charlotte in her apartment and levels his accusations at her. Charlotte pretends to try to seduce him, but is, in fact, reaching for a hidden gun as she embraces him, forcing Mike to kill her in self-defense.

Cast

 Biff Elliot as Mike Hammer
 Preston Foster as Captain Pat Chambers
 Peggie Castle as Charlotte Manning
 Margaret Sheridan as Velda
 Alan Reed as George Kalecki
 Mary Anderson as Eileen Vickers
 John Qualen as Dr. R.H. Vickers
 Tom Powers as Milt Miller

 Robert Swanger as Jack Williams 
 Frances Osborne as Myrna Devlin
 Bob Cunningham as Hal Kines
 Tani Guthrie as Esther Bellamy (as Tani Seitz)
 Dran Hamilton as Mary Bellamy (as Dran Seitz)
 Joe Besser as Pete elevator operator
 Elisha Cook Jr. as Bobo (uncredited)

Reception

Critical response
The film received mostly negative reviews at the time of its release.

Film critic Dennis Schwartz gave the film a mixed review but lauded the work of John Alton, writing, "The film was lucky to have the great cinematographer John Alton cast his magic noir shots to give it at least a moody look, but because of a limited budget Alton couldn't shoot the city Christmas scene on location and had to instead just show some Christmas cards to capture the city's seasonal spirit. Alton couldn't save this dull film from the poor acting, the risible dialogue, and the lame script. Biff Elliott is the main culprit when it comes to the poor acting. He had no presence and made his macho character into an unconvincing brute, someone devoid of a personality. The actresses were all bosomy stereotypes, including Peggie Castle, Margaret Sheridan, Frances Osborne, Mary Anderson and those riotous twin sisters Tani and Dran Seitz."

References

External links
 
 
 
 
 

1953 films
1953 crime drama films
1950s mystery films
1953 3D films
American 3D films
American black-and-white films
American crime drama films
American detective films
American mystery films
1953 directorial debut films
Film noir
Films scored by Franz Waxman
Films based on American novels
Films based on crime novels
Films based on works by Mickey Spillane
Films produced by Victor Saville
United Artists films
1950s English-language films
1950s American films
Mike Hammer (character) films